HMS Perseus was a British  built in 1929 and lost in 1941 during the Second World War. This class were the first to be fitted with Mark VIII torpedoes.

At the start of the war she was operating under the command of Commander Peter Bartlett on the China Station as part of the 4th Submarine Flotilla, together with the other members of her class. This continued until August 1940 when they were reassigned to the Mediterranean, where part of their duties were the ferrying of supplies between Alexandria and the besieged island of Malta. Perseus underwent a refit at Malta from October until April 1941.

It was as a result of these actions that Commander Nicolay was awarded the Distinguished Service Order.

Perseus sailed from Malta for Alexandria on 26 November 1941 with instructions to patrol waters to the east of Greece during her passage.

Of the 61 on board, the only survivor was 31-year-old leading stoker John Capes, one of two non-crew members hitching a lift to Alexandria. He and three others escaped from the submarine using the Twill Trunk escape hatch in the engine room and wearing Davis Submerged Escape Apparatus. However, only he survived the journey to the surface and the five-mile (8 km) swim to the island of Cephalonia, where he was hidden by islanders for 18 months before being smuggled in a caïque to Smyrna in Turkey. He was subsequently awarded a British Empire Medal.

The Perseus lies on the seabed with a starboard list. The only significant damage to the vessel is a crack on the port side near the bow, caused by the collision with the mine. The rest of the hull is in good condition. Her gun, her steering wheel, and everything else is in place. Her compasses, which are still working, show her last course. The escape hatch of the stern compartment is open.

Divers found the anchor of an Italian mine close to Perseus; which would appear to be the cause of her sinking. British authorities had assumed that this was the case, but it had never been confirmed.

On 19 and 20 May 2000, memorial ceremonies were held in Cephalonia in honour of the Perseus' crew. They were attended by relatives of the deceased (including John Capes' daughter), members of the Submarine Old Comrade's Association, locals who hid Capes, and a member of the caique crew who transported Capes to Smyrna (amongst others).

References

RN Subs HMS Perseus
Greek Navy website with information on Perseus and the diving expedition that located the wreck

External links

HMS Perseus submarine Video, 24 mins. Diving to the wreck site.
Υποβρύχιο Περσεύς - Διαφυγή από το Θάνατο (HMS Perseus submarine). Video, 29 mins.
H.M.Submarine Perseus 2007 in .... Video. Diver inside the wreck.
Royal Navy submarine "HMS Perseus", Kefalonia Island, Greece. Video, 1 min 26 secs. Dive on the wreck. 
The Man Who Survived for 18 Months On an Island After His Submarine Sank. Video, 10 mins.

 

Parthian-class submarines
Ships built in Barrow-in-Furness
1929 ships
World War II submarines of the United Kingdom
Lost submarines of the United Kingdom
World War II shipwrecks in the Mediterranean Sea
Shipwrecks of Greece
Maritime incidents in December 1941
Ships sunk by mines